Semenya is a surname. Notable people with the surname include:

Caiphus Semenya (born 1939), South African composer and musician
Caster Semenya (born 1991), South African middle-distance runner
Lesego Semenya (1982–2021), South African chef
Thabiso Semenya (born 1982), South African soccer player